Parkers Cove, in the Canadian province of Nova Scotia, is a coastal community in Annapolis County on the Bay of Fundy.

References

Communities in Annapolis County, Nova Scotia